Les Filles de Caleb is a Quebec TV series of 20 one-hour episodes, created by Jean Beaudin, based on the eponymous novel of Arlette Cousture, broadcast in 1990 on Radio-Canada and repeated in 2006 on Prise 2. An English-language version was also produced and broadcast in English Canada on CBC Television under the name Emilie. For it's broadcast in France, the title of Émilie, la passion d'une vie was used.

Plot
The series is set in the rural Mauricie region in the Province of Quebec at the end of the 19th century and through the beginning of the 20th century. Émilie, daughter of Caleb Bordeleau, decides to pursue her education. She faces great opposition from her small-minded entourage, but succeeds at becoming a school teacher. She falls in love with one of her students, the adventurer Ovila Pronovost, and is torn between her vocation and her love for him. The Bordeleau and Pronovost families worry about the alliance of these two lovers of such difficult to reconcile passions. After their marriage, they remain in the town of St-Tite and had many children. Ovila, restless and always attracted by wide open spaces, leaves the family to go up North to the Abitibi region, recently opened to colonisation, for opportunities to hunt and lumberjack. Émilie chooses to stay and bring up their family on her own. After the death of one of Ovila's brother, they moved to Shawinigan.

Cast
 Vincent Bolduc: Napoléon Bordeleau
 Marina Orsini: Émilie Bordeleau
 Roy Dupuis: Ovila Pronovost
 Germain Houde: Caleb Bordeleau
 Véronique Le Flaguais: Félicité Pronovost
 Pierre Curzi: Dosithée Pronovost
 Johanne-Marie Tremblay: Célina Bordeleau
 Jessica Barker: Charlotte Baumier
 Richard Blaimert: Edmond Pronovost
 Hugo Dubé: Joachim Crête
 Michel Goyette: Lazare Pronovost
 Patrick Goyette: Ovide Pronovost
 Lucie Laurier: Émilie, young
 Sophie Léger: Antoinette Arcand
 Jacques Lussier: Henri Douville
 Nathalie Mallette: Berthe Auclair
 Étienne de Passillé
 Karine Pelletier: Rose Pronovost
 Ysabelle Rosa: Rosée Pronovost
 Patrick Labbé: Télesphore Pronovost
 Annie Major-Matte: Marie-Ange Pronovost

References

External links 
 

Television shows filmed in Quebec
Ici Radio-Canada Télé original programming
1990 Canadian television series debuts
1991 Canadian television series endings
1990s Canadian drama television series